Staryi Sambir Raion was a raion in Lviv Oblast in western Ukraine. Its administrative center was the city of Staryi Sambir. The raion was abolished on 18 July 2020 as part of the administrative reform of Ukraine, which reduced the number of raions of Lviv Oblast to seven. The area of Staryi Sambir Raion was merged into Sambir Raion.

At the time of disestablishment, the raion consisted of four hromadas:
 Dobromyl urban hromada with the administration in the city of Dobromyl;
 Khyriv urban hromada with the administration in the city of Khyriv;
 Staryi Sambir urban hromada with the administration in Staryi Sambir;
 Strilky rural hromada with the administration in the selo of Strilky.

See also
 Administrative divisions of Lviv Oblast

References

Former raions of Lviv Oblast
1944 establishments in Ukraine
Ukrainian raions abolished during the 2020 administrative reform